Bhāṣā (or one of its derived forms) is the word for "language" in many South and Southeast Asian languages, which derives from the Sanskrit word  meaning "speech" or "spoken language". In transliteration from Sanskrit or Pali, bhasa may also be spelled bhasa, basa, or phasa.

The word Bahasa in English is sometimes used to refer specifically to the Malay language (especially its Indonesian variety). In standard Malay and Indonesian, this usage is considered incorrect. When referring to other languages, the non-capitalized word "bahasa" ("language") is used; for example, English and Italian are called bahasa Inggris and bahasa Italia respectively.

References

External links
 Rules on the use of Languages (bhāṣā), Chapter XVIII of the Nāṭyaśāstra

Indian words and phrases